Synkron is an open-source multiplatform utility designed for file synchronization of two or more folders, supporting synchs across computers. It is written in C++ and uses the Qt4 libraries. Synkron is distributed under the terms of the GPL v2.

Apart from carrying out synchronisations, Synkron provides other features. The user interface of Synkron is divided into several sections: Synchronise, Multisync, SyncView, Scheduler, Restore, Blacklist and Filters. The user can switch between these sections by using the toolbar. Multisync supports synching multiple folders into one folder.

Synkron is available as a portable app. It can be installed from the software repositories of most major KDE Linux distributions.

See also
 Comparison of file hosting services
 Comparison of file synchronization software
 Comparison of online backup services

References

External links

 Synkron's homepage

File copy utilities
Data synchronization